Douglas Corrance (born 1947) is a Scottish photographer who has made books about life across Scotland, including Glasgow and Edinburgh, as well as guides to Japan, France, India, and New York City. His work is held in the collection of the Scottish National Portrait Gallery.

Life and work
Corrance grew up in Inverness and began working in the darkroom at the Highland News there, at age 15. Within 6 months he was promoted to newspaper photographer. For a couple of years in the 1960s, he worked as a photographer in Sydney, Australia. At least in the late 1970s, he worked as a photographer for the Scottish Tourist Board. He has also worked at Scotland on Sunday. Corrance has made photography books about life across Scotland, including Glasgow in at least the 1970s and 1980s. He has also created guides to New York City, Japan, France, and India.

Publications

Books by Corrance
Edinburgh. Glasgow: Collins, 1979. . With captions by W. Gordon Smith.
Edinburgh in Colour. London: Batsford, 1980. . With an introduction and commentaries by John Hutchinson.
Glasgow. Collins, 1981. Photographs by Corrance, with commentary by Edward Boyd. .
Scotland: Five Decades of Photographs by Douglas Corrance: with text by Magnus Linklater. Collins, 1984. . With text by Magnus Linklater
Glasgow: from the Eye in the Sky. Edinburgh: Mainstream, 1988. . With text by Ian Archer.
Glasgow. Hong Kong: Apa, 1990. . Edited and produced by Marcus Brooke and Brian Bell.
Côte d'Azur. Insight Guides, 291. Boston, MA: Houghton Mifflin; Hong Kong: APA, 1993. With Catherine Karnow. . Edited by Rosemary Bailey.
New York. Ljubljana: DZS, 1997. Edited by David Wickers and Charlotte Atkins. .
The French Riviera. Insight guides. France series. London: Apa, 1998. With Karnow. . Edited by Bailey.
Scotland: a Visual Journey. Edinburgh: Mainstream, 1999. .
Scotland: Five Decades of Photographs by Douglas Corrance. Lomond, 2012. .

Zines by Corrance
Glasgow 1970s–1980s. Southport: Café Royal, 2020.
Scotland 1960s–1980s. Southport: Café Royal, 2020.
New York 1970s–1980s. Southport: Café Royal, 2021.

Collections
Corrance's work is held in the following permanent collection:
Scottish National Portrait Gallery, Edinburgh

References

External links

20th-century Scottish photographers
People from Inverness
Living people
1947 births
21st-century Scottish photographers